Ammann is a surname of German origin which is an alternative spelling of Amtmann or Amman, an historical kind of bailiff. Notable people with the surname include:

Alberto Ammann, Argentine actor
Daniel Ammann, Swiss author and journalist (born 1973)
Erwin Ammann, German politician and co-founder of the Christian Social Union of Bavaria (1916 – 2000)
Gretel Ammann (1947–2000), Spanish philosopher, writer and activist
Jakob Ammann, Swiss anabaptist leader and founder of the Amish (c. 1644 – c. 1730)
Johann Conrad Ammann, Swiss physician and fossil collector (1724 – 1811)
Johann Konrad Ammann, Swiss physician and instructor of deaf persons (1669 – 1724)
Johann Schneider-Ammann, Swiss politician (born 1952)
Mike Ammann, American soccer player (born 1971)
Othmar Ammann, structural engineer who built many of New York City's bridges (1879 – 1965)
Robert Ammann, American amateur mathematician with contributions to aperiodic tilings (1946 – 1994)
Simon Ammann, Swiss ski jumper (born 1981)
Thomas Ammann, Swiss art dealer and collector (1950 – 1993)

See also 
 Ammann Group, a Swiss mechanical engineering company, founded in 1869 by Jakob Ammann 
 an unusual alternative spelling of the Jordanian capital Amman
 Amman (disambiguation)
 Amtmann
 Landammann

German-language surnames